Godunov is a Russian historical drama television series created by Ilya Tikin and Nikolay Borisov, directed by Alexei Andrianov and Timur Alpatov. The first season premiered from November 5 to November 8, 2018 on the "Russia-1" national TV channel. The second season premiered from March 25 to March 29, 2019.

The series tells the story of historical events covering the years 1580 to 1613, from the late reign of Ivan the Terrible (1530-1584), the first Tsar of all Rus', until the ascension to the Russian throne of Mikhail I Romanov (1598-1645). It centers upon the fate of the Godunov family: Tsar Boris Godunov (1551-1605), his wife Maria Skuratova-Belskaya, his sister Irina Godunova, his son Fyodor II of Russia and his daughter Tsarevna Xenia Borisovna.

The creators based themselves upon the novel-chronicle "Shipwreck near the Island of Hope" (1978, not translated) by historical novelist Konstantin Badygin. The novel tells the story of Boris Godunov's rise to power and the struggle of the powerful Stroganov family with the background of English merchants trying to establish privileged trade relations. The authors slightly changed the storylines, simplifying them and replacing some of the characters. Nonetheless, most of the characters are strictly historical. The score was written and orchestrated by renowned Kazakh composer Artem Vasilyev

The series is currently available on Region 1 DVD (in Russian with English subtitles) and on Amazon's Prime Video. Its IMDb ID is 9401912

Plot 

Russia, around the year 1600: The mysterious death of the rightful heir Dmitry of Uglich ends the rule of the Rurik dynasty, leading to a power struggle. The ambiguous Tsar Boris Godunov's rise to power meets with deceitful conspiracies by the Russian aristocrats, the "Boyars"; the destruction of his whole family and the troubled years that follow are unveiled in this major saga, featuring excellent period reconstructions, accurate historicity, costumes, and top-notch acting.

Season One covers the historical period from the last years of Tsar Ivan the Terrible's reign until the coronation of Boris Godunov in 1598. Season Two's first four episodes cover the 7-year long reign of Tsar Boris, marked by a two-year famine and the enmity of the Boyars who disliked the Tsar because "he wasn't one of them" whilst he sought to curb their power.
After Tsar Boris's death in 1605, eight more years of troubles follow, that will witness five successive rulers, including two impostors, seizing power. The series ends with the successful resistance of the Trinity Lavra of St. Sergius monastery withstanding a celebrated 16-month Polish-Lithuanian historical siege.

Cast 

Season One

 Sergey Bezrukov as Boris Godunov, oprichnik, Boyar, then Tsar of all Russia in 1598
 Svetlana Khodchenkova as Maria Skuratova-Belskaya, Tsarina, wife of Godunov, daughter of Malyuta Skuratov
 Sergei Makovetsky as Ivan IV the Terrible, Tsar of all Russia
 Viktor Sukhorukov as Malyuta Skuratov
 Aleksandr Ustyugov as Fyodor Nikitich Romanov, Patriarch Filaret of Moscow
 Maria Andreyeva as Xenia Shestova, wife of Fyodor Romanov (Patriarch Filaret), mother of Mikhail of Russia
 Andrey Merzlikin as Prince Vasily Shuyski, later Vasily IV, tsar of all Russia (1606-1610)
 Fyodor Lavrov as Feodor I of Russia, Tsar of all Russia (1576-1584), third son of Ivan the Terrible
 Anna Mikhalkova as Tsarina Irina Godunova, sister of Boris Godunov, wife of Tsar Feodor I
 Vladimir Steklov as Andrey Shchelkalov
 Irina Pegova as Maria Nagaya, Tsarina, seventh wife of Ivan the Terrible, mother of Dmitry
 Klim Berdinsky as Prince Dmitry of Uglich, last son of Ivan the Terrible with Maria Nagaya (1582-1591?)
 Anton Kuznetsov as Bogdan Belsky, statesman, nephew of Malyuta Skuratov
 Anna Kovalchuk as Princess Maria Vladimirovna of Staritsa
 Yevgeny Tsyganov as Tsarevich Ivan Ivanovich of Russia, second son of Ivan the Terrible (1530-1584)
 Kristina Brodskaya as Tsesarevna Yelena Sheremeteva, wife of Ivan Ivanovich
 Alexander Gorbatov as Prince Fedor Mstislavsky
 Alexander Ilyin as Prince Ivan Mstislavsky
 Yury Belyayev as Prince Ivan Shuysky, uncle of Vasily Shuyski
 Nikolay Schrayber as Prince Dmitry Shuyski, brother of Vasily Shuyski
 Polina Dudkina as Princess Ekaterina Shuyskaya, wife of Dmitry Shuyski, daughter of Malyuta Skuratov
 Albert Kobrowski as "The Rider"
 Lev Prygunov as Boyar Nikita Romanovich Zakharin-Yuryev, father of Fyodor Romanov, uncle of Tsar Fedor Ivanovich
 Alexander Pashutin as Boyar Feodor Nagoy, father of the tsaritsa Maria Nagaya, uncle of Prince Dmitry Ivanovich
 Artyom Alekseev as Stepan Godunov, Tsar Boris's devout and devious aide-de-camp 
 Alexander Semchev as Peter Golovin, Treasurer
 Sergei Nikonenko as Nikita Stroganov
 Boris Klyuyev as Dionysius, Metropolitan of Moscow and All Russia
 Boris Plotnikov as Patriarch Job of Moscow (Iov)
 Sergei Ghazarov  as Patriarch Jeremias II of Constantinople
 Yuri Kolokolnikov as Jerome Gorsey, English merchant
 Lymutis Sedjus as Sir Jerome Bowes, English Ambassador to Russia
 Sergey Borisov as Fedor Kon, architect
 Oleg Vasilkov as Mikhail Bityagovsky
 Nina Dvorzhetskaya as Vasilisa Volokhova, Prince Dmitry's nanny
 Sergey Barkovsky as Lev Sapega, Lithuanian Commander
 Seydullah Moldakhanov as Ğazi II Giray, khan of the Crimean Khanate
 Albinas Kelaris as Johann Eilof, Dutch healer
 Len Blavatnik as Cardinal Jerzy Radziwiłł (1556–1600)
 Nikolai Denisov as Tishka, servant of Fyodor Romanov
 Andrius Paulavicius as Anton Marsh, English merchant
 Remigijus Sabulis as John Brown, English merchant
 Vaidotas Martinaitis as Richard Ingram, English merchant
 Leonid Timtsunik as Trifon Patrikeyev
 Igor Sigov as commandant of the castle in Riga
 Sergey Serov as Semyon Duda, Governor
 Yulia Galkina as Praskovya Sicheva
 Ivan Mokhovikov as Istoma Sovin, an archer 
 Piotr Logachev as Ondryushka Mochalov of Uglich
 Pavel Srebor as Semion Saburov, Governor
 Vilen Babichev as Archip, the executioner

Season Two

 Sergey Bezrukov as Boris Godunov, Tsar of all Russia
 Svetlana Khodchenkova as Tsarina Maria Skuratova-Belskaya, Godunov's wife
 Darya Ursulyak as Tsarevna Xenia Borisovna Godunova, Boris's daughter
 Ilya Ilinikh as Tsarevich Feodor II of Russia, Boris's son and short-lived Tsar (April–June 1605)
 Yevgeny Tkachuk as False Dmitry I (aka the Monk Grigory Otrepiev), impostor, Tsar of all Russia (1605-1606)
 Olga Kalitska as Marina Mniszech, Tsarina, wife of False Dmitry I
 Miroslav Enkot as Jerzy Mniszech, Polish nobleman and diplomat, father of Marina Mniszech
 Tamara Spirichova as the old mother of False Dmitry I
 Ivan Kolesnikov as Ilya, polyglot and interpreter, in a sentimental relationship with Xenia Borisovna
 Kirill Zaytsev as Nechay Kolyvanov, former palace guard and voivod of False Dmitry I
 Alexandra Nikiforova as Sophia Fyodorovna, daughter of Fyodor Konya and wife of Nechay
 Sergey Diakov as Pronka, an archer and palace guard, friend of Nechay
 Petr Rykov as Vasily Golitsyn (1643)
 Andrey Udalov as John, Prince of Schleswig-Holstein (Johan) betrothed to Xenia Borisovna
 Jana Yesipovich as Pronka's Wife
 Nikolai Kozak as Betsky / Old Porfiry
 Anton Kapanin as a street performer
 Larissa Shakhvorostova as Feklitsa, a Soothsayer
 Dmitry Frid as Doctor Fidler, court physician-healer
 Pyotr Zaychenko as Patriarch Hermogenes of Moscow
 Yuri Tarasov as False Dmitri II
 Stanislav Lyubshin as Archimandrite Ioasaf
 Sergey Marin as Voyevoda, Prince Grigory Dolgorukov
 Alexey Ovsyannikov as Mikhail Saltykov, a Boyar of False Dmitry II
 Anton Batyrev as Ivan Zarutsky, Ataman (commander) of the Don Cossacks and Marina Mniszech's lover
 Anastasia Mikhailova as Ephrosinya, a young and beautiful runaway girl
 Nikolai Larchuzhenkov as Emyelka, the dwarf jailer
 Maxim Vajov as Mikhail, a Cossack

References 

Russia-1 original programming
Russian drama television series
2018 Russian television series debuts
2019 Russian television series endings
2010s Russian television series
Historical television series
Russian-language television shows
Russian biographical television series